Jacob J. Garcia (born March 3, 2005) is an American professional stock car racing driver. He competes full-time in the NASCAR Craftsman Truck Series, driving the No. 35 Chevrolet Silverado for McAnally-Hilgemann Racing.

Racing career
Garcia made his midget racing debut in 2016, driving in the USAC Eastern Midget Series.  He raced in midget cars for three years, and made his first late model debut in 2018 for the Champion Racing Association. He would continue running late model races in 2019, where he won the track championship at Five Flags Speedway in pro late models. In 2020, he ran full time in the Southern Super Series, and won Rookie of the Year honors. He would win the championship a year later, making him the youngest champion in the series at 16 years old. He would continue to have success in late model racing. He also competed in CARS Tour.

ARCA Menards Series West
On October 26, 2021, Garcia would sign with David Gilliland Racing, and would drive in the final race of the 2021 ARCA Menards Series West at Phoenix Raceway. He started 4th and finished 6th.

NASCAR Craftsman Truck Series

2022
On March 16, 2022, McAnally-Hilgemann Racing announced that Garcia will drive five races for the team in the 2022 NASCAR Camping World Truck Series, starting at Martinsville Speedway on April 7. The number will be the 35, which is his late model number.

However, qualifying was rained out and since the No. 35 team didn’t have any points, Garcia failed to make the race.

Garcia made his Truck debut at World Wide Technology Raceway on June 4th, 2022. He ran around midpack until a collision with Tanner Gray put him multiple laps down. He finished 29th.

2023
On December 6, 2022, McAnally-Hilgemann Racing announced that Garcia will run full-time for the team in 2023, continuing to run the No. 35 truck. Because of age restrictions, Garcia will miss the season-opener race at Daytona. NASCAR has granted him a waiver that will still make him eligible for the playoffs. In his first race of the season at Las Vegas, he scored his first career top-10.

Personal life
Garcia currently attends Athens Academy, and will graduate in the class of 2023.

Motorsports career results

NASCAR
(key) (Bold – Pole position awarded by qualifying time. Italics – Pole position earned by points standings or practice time. * – Most laps led. ** – All laps led.)

Craftsman Truck Series

ARCA Menards Series West

References

External links
 Official website
 Official profile at McAnally-Hilgemann Racing
 

2005 births
Living people
ARCA Menards Series drivers
NASCAR drivers
Racing drivers from Georgia (U.S. state)
CARS Tour drivers